Uropterygius wheeleri is a moray eel found in shallow waters in the eastern Atlantic Ocean, around Cape Verde, Senago, and islands in the Bay of Biafra.

References

wheeleri
Fish described in 1967